First Album is the debut studio album by French electronic music duo Miss Kittin & The Hacker, released in 2001. It includes the tracks "1982" and "Frank Sinatra", two anthems of the late-1990s electroclash scene that had been first released on the EP Champagne (1998).

Critical reception

The album received generally favorable reviews. It earned a collective score of 68 out of 100 from Metacritic.  Adam Bregman from Allmusic commented, "This French-Swiss duo pumps out retro-'80s-style disco beats and silly lyrics, creating a fun, goofy, ironic vibe [...] They seem to be trying to reach over and above that generally stale genre, and they mostly succeed."

Fact placed First Album at number 92 on its "100 best: Albums of the Decade" list.  Mixer placed First Album at number five on its "Best Albums of 2002" list. Muzik placed it at number 15 on its list of the "Top 30 Albums of 2001". Resident Advisor ranked the album number 94 on its list of the "Top 100 albums of the 2000s".

Commercial performance
Despite not charting, First Album sold over 50,000 copies worldwide.

Track listing

Personnel
 Miss Kittin – vocals, vibes
 The Hacker – programming
 LeroYorel – cover
 F. Holzer – photos

References

2001 debut albums
Miss Kittin albums
The Hacker albums
Emperor Norton Records albums